Joshua Darius Kamani Wilson-Esbrand (born 26 December 2002) is an English professional footballer who plays as a defender for EFL Championship club Coventry City, on loan from Manchester City.

Club career
In 2019, Wilson-Esbrand left West Ham United to join the academy of Manchester City. On 21 September 2021 he made his professional debut when he was named in the starting line up for Manchester City's EFL Cup tie against Wycombe Wanderers.

On 10 January 2023, Wilson-Esbrand joined Coventry City on a loan for the remainder of the 2022–23 season, taking the number 11 shirt.

International career
In November 2019, Wilson-Esbrand represented the England under-18 team.  On 11 November 2021, he made his U20 debut during a 2–0 defeat to Portugal in the 2021–22 Under 20 Elite League.

Career statistics

References

External links
 

2002 births
Living people
English footballers
Manchester City F.C. players
Coventry City F.C. players
Association football defenders
England youth international footballers
Black British sportspeople
People from Hackney, London
Footballers from Greater London